EDB Fakel (Russian ОКБ "Факел") is a Russian electric propulsion system development company. It is located in Kaliningrad in Kaliningrad Oblast. It was founded in 1955 as a Propulsion laboratory of the Soviet Academy of Sciences; in 1962 it obtained status of Design Bureau, OKB.

Overview 
Fakel specializes in spacecraft attitude control thrusters, ion engines and plasma sources. It is a world leader in the field of Hall thruster development and a leading Russian developer and manufacturer of electric propulsion systems. The company's third-generation electric propulsion system SPT-100 has been certified in accordance with western standards and the company is actively marketing the system to foreign customers.

The company has 960 employees.

Flight missions 
Many companies have used Fakel electrically powered spacecraft propulsion systems on their hardware flown in space.  Company's hardware were used on SESAT 1, Alphasat, SMART-1, LS-1300, Meteor spacecraft, USP bus, AMOS-6, MobaHo!, Inmarsat-4 F3, Astra 1K, Luch, and many others as well.

Partners 
Due to the large experience gained by the company in electric engines, notable companies have entered into partnership with the company.

ISS-Reshetnev - Khrunichev - TsSKB-Progress - NPO Lavochkin - RKK Energiya - Keldysh Research Center - CNIIHM - Moscow Aviation Institute - Aerojet Rocketdyne - Snecma - Thales Alenia Space - Airbus Defence and Space - Space Systems/Loral - RUAG - Israel Aerospace Industries - OHB Sweden - Aerospazio.

References

External links 
Company website

Soviet and Russian space institutions
Aerospace companies of the Soviet Union
Roscosmos divisions and subsidiaries
Companies based in Kaliningrad Oblast
Federal State Unitary Enterprises of Russia
Design bureaus